Techtochrysin is a chemical compound. It is an O-methylated flavone, a flavonoid isolated from Prunus cerasus, the sour cherry, a plant native to much of Europe and southwest Asia.

Glycosides 
 Techtochrysin 5-glucoside

References 

 

Aromatase inhibitors
O-methylated flavones